The Transylvanian Association for Romanian Literature and the Culture of the Romanian People (ASTRA) is a cultural association founded in 1861 in Sibiu (Hermannstadt). It had an important role in the cultural life and the movement of national awakening for the Romanians in Transylvania.

Its first president was the ethnic Romanian Orthodox Metropolitan of Sibiu — Andrei Şaguna. Its vicepresident was the Greek-Catholic priest Timotei Cipariu, and George Bariţiu was secretary.

Shortly after its founding, the association established a boarding school, museum, and large library in its provenance of Sibiu, and later developed a network of ASTRA libraries in Transylvanian towns. On 7 February 1895, ASTRA decided to edit and publish a Romanian Encyclopedia under the supervision of Cornel Diaconovici. It was published in three volumes between 1898 and 1904, and had an important role in the culture and politics of the Romanians.

Today, the central ASTRA library contains approximately half a million works, mostly acquired through donations of the Transylvanian population, local publishing houses, or publication exchanges organized with other libraries.

Gallery

See also 
 Transylvanian School
 ASTRA National Museum Complex

References

External links 

Sibiu
Romanian culture
Romanian nationalism
Social history of Austria-Hungary
Culture of Transylvania